Vin Williams (born 10 July 1932) is  a former Australian rules footballer who played with Fitzroy in the Victorian Football League (VFL). 	

Williams was offered the Shepparton coaching position in 1960, which eventually went to Tom Hafey but Williams opted for the Benalla role and lead them from 1960 to 1963 which included a Ovens & Murray Football League grand loss in 1961 and two premierships in 1962 and 1963.

Notes

External links 		
		
		
		
		
		
		
Living people		
1932 births		
		
Australian rules footballers from Victoria (Australia)		
Fitzroy Football Club players
Castlemaine Football Club players